Teneriffe can refer to:

 Tenerife, Spanish island in the Atlantic Ocean
 Teneriffe, Queensland, suburb of Brisbane
 Teneriffe lace, type of lace made in Tenerife
 Montes Teneriffe, a mountain range on the northern part of the Moon's near side
 Mount Teneriffe, a mountain in Victoria, Australia
 Mount Teneriffe (Washington), a mountain in the United States
 Pico Teneriffe (Barbados), a cape on the north coast of Barbados